Castleton is an unincorporated community in Stark County, Illinois, United States, located  northeast of Wyoming. Castleton has a post office with ZIP code 61426.

Castleton was named for Dr. Alfred Castle, who was instrumental in introducing a railroad into the settlement.

References

Unincorporated communities in Stark County, Illinois
Unincorporated communities in Illinois
Peoria metropolitan area, Illinois